The 2003 Canada Masters and the Rogers AT&T Cup were tennis tournaments played on outdoor hard courts. It was the 114th edition of the Canada Masters and was part of the Tennis Masters Series of the 2003 ATP Tour and of Tier I of the 2003 WTA Tour. The men's tournament took place at the du Maurier Stadium in Montreal in Canada from August 4 through August 10, 2003 while the women's event took place at the National Tennis Centre in Toronto in Canada from August 11 through August 17, 2003.

On the men's side were present World No. 1, Australian Open and Miami champion Andre Agassi, French Open and Monte Carlo winner Juan Carlos Ferrero and Wimbledon champion Roger Federer. Other top seeds competing were recent Umag winner Carlos Moyá, Indian Wells champion Lleyton Hewitt, Andy Roddick, Guillermo Coria and Rainer Schüttler.

The women's field was led by new World No. 1, French Open, Indian Wells, Rome and recent Los Angeles champion Kim Clijsters, Charleston and Berlin winner Justine Henin-Hardenne and Warsaw champion Amélie Mauresmo. Among other seeds were Australian Open quarterfinalist Daniela Hantuchová, Doha champion Anastasia Myskina, Magdalena Maleeva, Amanda Coetzer and Jelena Dokić.

Finals

Men's singles

 Andy Roddick defeated  David Nalbandian 6–1, 6–3
 It was Roddick's 4th title of the year and the 11th of his career. It was his 1st career Masters title.

Women's singles

 Justine Henin-Hardenne defeated  Lina Krasnoroutskaya 6–1, 6–0
 It was Henin-Hardenne's 6th title of the year and the 14th of her career. It was her 3rd Tier I title of the year and her 4th overall.

Men's doubles

 Mahesh Bhupathi /  Max Mirnyi defeated  Jonas Björkman /  Todd Woodbridge 6–3, 7–6(7–4)
 It was Bhupathi's 3rd title of the year and the 29th of his career. It was Mirnyi's 5th title of the year and the 18th of his career.

Women's doubles

 Svetlana Kuznetsova /  Martina Navratilova defeated  María Vento-Kabchi /  Angelique Widjaja 3–6, 6–1, 6–1
 It was Kuznetsova's 4th title of the year and the 9th of her career. It was Navrátilová's 5th title of the year and the 346th of her career.

References

External links
 Official website
 ATP Tournament Profile
 WTA Tournament Profile

 
Canada Masters
Rogers ATandT Cup
Canadian Open (tennis)
2003 in Canadian sports
2003 in Toronto
2000s in Montreal
2003 in Quebec
August 2003 sports events in Canada